Madhopur is a village in Barharia block of Siwan district in the Indian state of Bihar. Madhopur is surrounded by Sahpur to the north, Barasra south, Chhatisi east, and Rasulpur to the west. Barharia, Siwan, Gopalganj, Mirganj, Barauli and Thawe are nearby towns.

There are six villages in Madhopur Panchayat: Madhopur, Kalu Chhapra, Nirkhi Chhapra, Mira Chhapra, Chhakka Tola (Azad Nagar) and Nasir Chhapra

Demographics
Languages spoken in Madhopur include Bhojpuri (a language in the Bihari language group with almost 40,000,000 speakers), written in both the Devanagari (English) and Kaithi scripts.

Climate
 Subtropical, dry climate with distinct winter, summer and rainy season
 Highest temperature = 43.0 °C (May–June)
 Lowest temperature  = 6.0 °C (December–January)
 Average rainfall = 
 Monsoon = July to September
 Humidity = 10 – 15% (summer), 60% (rainy)
 Visit season = October–May

Sports
The village is represented by MP XI Cricket Club and Sadbhawna Volleyball Club.

Transportation
Madhopur is well connected with Barharia, Gopalganj and Mirganj by local taxi services on shared basis and with Patna by the Gopalganj-Patna bus service (via Barharia, Siwan and Chhapra) which one can board at Madhopur Middle School bus stand. The nearest railway station is Siwan Junction.

Roads
SH-45 (Gopalganj Maharajganj Road) and MDR 24 (Mirganj Barharia Road) state highway pass through the village.

See also
Barharia (Vidhan Sabha constituency)

References

Villages in Siwan district